The Wiardi Beckman Stichting (The Wiardi Beckman Foundation) is a Dutch think tank linked to the left-of-centre Labour Party (PvdA).

The foundation is named after Herman Bernard Wiardi Beckman, a member of the Dutch Senate, who during the Second World War was summoned by Queen Wilhelmina to become a member of the war cabinet, but who was caught by the Sicherheitsdienst and who died in the Dachau concentration camp.

The foundation published the magazine Socialisme & Democratie (Socialism & Democracy) since 1970.

References

External links 
 Official website of the Wiardi Beckman Stichting (In Dutch)

Labour Party (Netherlands)
Political and economic think tanks based in the European Union
Political and economic research foundations